Raúl Federico Bergara  (born December 29, 1971, in Montevideo) is a former Uruguayan footballer.

Club career
Bergara played for Estudiantes de La Plata in the Primera División de Argentina.

International career
Bergara made eight appearances for the senior Uruguay national football team during 1999, including six matches at the Copa América 1999.

Palmares

References

 

1971 births
Living people
Uruguayan footballers
Uruguay international footballers
1999 Copa América players
Uruguayan expatriate footballers
Uruguayan Primera División players
Argentine Primera División players
Rampla Juniors players
Racing Club de Montevideo players
Peñarol players
Club Nacional de Football players
Estudiantes de La Plata footballers
Footballers from Montevideo
Expatriate footballers in Argentina
Association football defenders